Théodore Georges Fath (Paris,  22 January 1818 – Maisons-Laffitte, 1900) was a 19th-century French playwright, illustrator and writer as well as Jacques Fath's great-grandfather.

Biography 
He first studied sculpture and became known in 1840 with a drama, La Femme de l'émigré.

Apart from his own works, Fath illustrated the Contes d'une vieille fille à ses neveux by Delphine de Girardin, with Gustave Doré for Michel Lévy (1866), the Historiettes véritables pour les enfants de quatre à huit ans by Zulma Carraud (1879) and Jeux et exercices des jeunes filles by Madame de Chabreul for Hachette (1890), Jocrisse et sa sœur by Pierre-Jules Hetzel (1878) or else Un petit-fils de Robinson by Philibert Audebrand in collaboration with Aloys Fellmann for the éditions Lefèvre (1878).

He wrote feuilletons, novels and short stories. Je also translated the tales by Christoph von Schmid (1852) for the Magasin des enfants.

Works 

1840: La Femme de l'émigré, two-act drama mingled with songs, with Adolphe Guénée
1844: De Charybde en Scylla, vaudeville
1845: Les nains célèbres depuis l'antiquité, jusques et y compris Tom-Pouce, Havard
1847: Partie à trois, one-act comedy, mingled with couplets, with Eugène Nus and Auguste Follet
1849: La mort de Chatterton, drama in verse, Havard
1855: La Prison de Schlusselbourg
1856: Le Dernier jour d'une monarchie, five-act drama, with Auriol
1863: Les Brûleurs de villes
1865: La sagesse des enfants, proverbes, Hachette
1867: Gredin de Pigoche !, one-act operetta, with Michel Masson
1868: Pierrot à l'école, Hetzel
1869: Le Paris des enfants, petit voyage à travers la grande ville, Hachette
1871: Marie la petite étourdie, Bernardin-Béchet
1873: Les Contes du vieux docteur, Ducrocq
1874: Le Paris des enfants. Petit voyage à travers la grande ville, text and illustrations, Hachette
1875: Perdus au milieu de Paris, histoire de trois orphelin, Ducrocq
1877: Le Bon cœur de Lucette, Bernardin-Béchet
1877: L'Éducation d'Aline, Ducrocq
1878: Un drôle de voyage, Hetzel
1880: Pierrot à l'école et chez son ami Paillasse, 55 vignettes by Fath, text by Fath and un Papa, Hetzel
1881: Prisonniers dans les glaces, Plon
1882: Les cataractes de l'Obi, voyage dans les steppes sibériennes, Plon
1883: Les Études de Petit-Pierre, text and drawings, Delagrave
1885: La Sagesse des enfants, proverbes, text and illustrations, Hachette
1888: Bernard, la gloire de son village, Hachette

Bibliography 
 Gustave Vapereau, Dictionnaire universel des contemporains, 1870,  
 Pierre Larousse, Nouveau Larousse illustré, supplément, 1906, 
 Robert Sabatier, Histoire de la poésie française, Poésie du XIXe siècle, 1977, 
 Valérie Guillaume, Jacques Fath, 1993, 
 Jean-Marie Embs, Philippe Mellot, 100 ans de livres d'enfant et de jeunesse: 1840-1940, 2006, 
 Francis Marcoin, Librairie de jeunesse et littérature industrielle au XIXe siècle, 2006, 

19th-century French dramatists and playwrights
19th-century French illustrators
1818 births
Writers from Paris
1900 deaths